Faisal Ayyadah (born 18 July 1988) is a Saudi football player. He currently plays for Al-Mehmal as a striker.

References

External links
 

1988 births
Living people
Saudi Arabian footballers
Al Batin FC players
Al-Orobah FC players
Al-Jabalain FC players
Al-Watani Club players
Qaryat Al-Ulya Club players
Al-Mehmal Club players
Saudi First Division League players
Saudi Professional League players
Saudi Second Division players
Saudi Fourth Division players
Association football forwards